George Odhiambo Ogutu is a Kenyan footballer currently playing for Tusker in the Kenyan Premier League. He was featured in Goal.com's 100 Young Stars to Look Out for in 2011.

Club career

George Odhiambo attended Thur Gem High School. He began his career playing for Gor Mahia of Kenya at the age of 16. He became a star player for Gor Mahia and was awarded the "Most Promising Player" award in the 2009 Kenyan Premier League. In the 2010 season, he was awarded the Kenyan Premier League Player of the Year award.

Randers
George was signed by Danish Superliga club Randers FC in January 2011. He made his debut in a match against FC Nordsjælland. He came on the pitch, replacing Jonas Kamper and the match ended 2–1 to the opponent.

Azam
After a rather unsuccessful season in Denmark, Odhiambo signed with Azam in the Tanzanian Premier League at the start of the 2012 season. However, he fell out of favour within the squad and was released from his contract in July.

Nairobi City Stars
Having been a free agent for nearly six months, Odhiambo signed a six-month deal with the Nairobi City Stars in the Tusker Premier League on 9 January 2013.

Shirak FC
On 28 February 2013, Odhiambo signed a 3-year contract with ambitious Armenian club Shirak after impressing during a two-week trial. Odhiambo made his debut for Shirak on 3 March against Ararat Yerevan in the Armenian Cup. Odhiambo's first goal for Shirak came on 30 March 2013 in a 4–3 victory over Impulse in the Armenian Premier League.

Return to Gor Mahia
On 7 January 2014, it was announced that Odhiambo returned to his former team Gor Mahia, signing a one-year deal.

Tusker
On 8 August 2019, Odhiambo joined Tusker on a two-year deal.

International career

George has been a regular in the Kenya national football team since 2009, playing alongside stars such as McDonald Mariga and Dennis Oliech.

Style of play

George plays predominantly as a winger but can also play as a striker. His greatest assets are his dribbling ability and pace.

Nickname
Curiously, George is known to his fans as "BlackBerry". It is believed that this moniker was given to him by a local journalist, who upon seeing the forward play remarked, "He is like my blackberry; he can do everything."

Achievements
Shirak
 Armenian Premier League : 2012–13
 Armenian Cup runner-up: 2012–13

References

External links

1992 births
Living people
Kenyan footballers
Kenya international footballers
Association football forwards
Gor Mahia F.C. players
Randers FC players
Kuopion Palloseura players
Azam F.C. players
FC Shirak players
Ulisses FC players
Tusker F.C. players
Kenyan Premier League players
Danish Superliga players
Armenian Premier League players
Kenyan expatriate footballers
Kenyan expatriate sportspeople in Denmark
Kenyan expatriate sportspeople in Finland
Kenyan expatriate sportspeople in Tanzania
Expatriate men's footballers in Denmark
Expatriate footballers in Finland
Expatriate footballers in Tanzania